Lucretia the Tumbler, also known as Lucrece the Tumbler and Lucrecia the Tumbler (fl. 1542), was a court jester in the court of Mary I of England.

Lucretia was employed as a chamberer to Princess Mary. She was a member of her household from at least 1542. She and Jane Foole sometimes received identical clothes and shoes. It has been suggested by author John Southworth that Lucretia was at some time Jane's caretaker or friend. It is known that Lucretia and Jane performed together. However, unlike Jane, Lucretia was a trained entertainer with skills.

Today entertainers sometimes perform as Lucretia in Renaissance-themed entertainments such as Renaissance faires.

References

Jesters
16th-century English women
English courtiers
Chamberers at court
Court of Mary I of England